Baruipur subdivision is an administrative subdivision of the South 24 Parganas district in the Indian state of West Bengal.

Subdivisions
South 24 Parganas district is divided into five administrative subdivisions:

29.36% of the total population of South 24 Parganas district live in Baruipur subdivision.

Administrative units
Baruipur subdivision has 9 police stations, 7 community development blocks, 7 panchayat samitis, 80 gram panchayats, 523 mouzas, 482 inhabited villages, 3 municipalities and 30 census towns. The municipalities are at Jaynagar Majilpur, Baruipur and Rajpur Sonarpur. The census towns are: Radhanagar, Danga, Ramchandrapur, Bidyadharpur, Kalikapur, Chak Baria, Sahebpur, Raynagar, Kalikapur Barasat, Baharu, Uttarparanij, Alipur, Uttar Durgapur, Nimpith, Tulshighata, Petua, Garia, Panchghara, Mallikpur, Hariharpur, Champahati, Solgohalia, Naridana, Baruipur (CT), Salipur (P), Khodar Bazar, Komarhat, Maricha, Bhangar Raghunathpur and Gobindapur.

Kolkata Urban Agglomeration
The following Municipalities and census towns in South 24 Parganas district were part of Kolkata Urban Agglomeration in the 2011 census: Maheshtala (M), Joka (CT), Balarampur (CT), Chata Kalikapur (CT), Budge Budge (M), Nischintapur (CT), Uttar Raypur (CT), Pujali (M) and Rajpur Sonarpur (M).

Police stations
Police stations in Baruipur subdivision have the following features and jurisdiction:

Blocks
Community development blocks in Baruipur subdivision are:

Gram panchayats
The subdivision contains 80 gram panchayats under 7 community development blocks:

 Baruipur CD block consists of 18 gram panchayats: Begumpur, Dhapdhapi II, Mallikpur, Shankarpur II, Belegachhi, Hardhah, Nabagram, Shikharbali I, Brindakhali, Hariharpur, Ramnagar I, Shikharbali II, Champahati, Kalyanpur, Ramnagar II, Dhapdhapi I, Madarat and Shankarpur I.
 Bhangar I CD block consists of nine gram panchayats: Bodra, Durgapur, Pranganj, Chandaneswar I, Jagulgachhi, Shanksahar, Chandaneswar II, Narayanpur and Tarda.
 Bhangar II CD block consists of ten gram panchayats: Bamanghata, Bhagawanpur, Chaltaberia, Shanpukur, Benttata I, Bhogali I, Polerhat I, Benttata II, Bhogali II, Polerhat II.
 Jaynagar I CD block consists of 12 gram panchayats: Baharu Kshetra, Dhosa Chandaneshwar, Khakurdaha, Uttar Durgapur, Bamangachi, Narayani Tala, Chaltaberia, Harinarayanpur, Rajpur Korabag, Dakshin Barasat, Jangalia and Sripur.
 Jaynagar II CD block consists of ten gram panchayats: Baishata, Phutigoda, Mayahauri, Sahajadapur, Beladurganagar, Gordoani, Mayda, Chuprijhara, Monirhat and Nalgora.
 Kultali CD block consists of nine gram panchayats: Deulbari Debipur, Jalaberia I, Maipith Baikunthapur, Gopalganj, Jalaberia II, Gurguria Bhubaneswari, Kundakhali Godabar, Meriganj I and Meriganj II.
 Sonarpur CD block consists of 11 gram panchayats: Banhooghly I, Kalikapur II, Kheyadaha II, Pratapnagar, Banhooghly II, Kamrabad, Langalberia, Sonarpur II, Kalikapur I, Kheyadaha I and Poleghat.

Education
South 24 Parganas district had a literacy rate of 77.51% as per the provisional figures of the census of India 2011. Alipore Sadar subdivision had a literacy rate of 81.14%, Baruipur subdivision 77.45%, Canning subdivision 70.98%, Diamond Harbour subdivision 76.26% and Kakdwip subdivision 82.04%
  
Given in the table below (data in numbers) is a comprehensive picture of the education scenario in South 24 Parganas district, with data for the year 2013-14:

.* Does not include data for portions of South 24 Parganas district functioning under Kolkata Municipal Corporation

The following institutions are located in Baruipur subdivision:
Ramakrishna Mission Residential College was established at Narendrapur in 1960.
Ramakrishna Mission Blind Boys Academy College was established at Narendrapur in 1965, It is affiliated with the University of Calcutta and is recognised by the Rehabiltation Council of India. It specialises in education/ teacher education. It has a hostel, a computer centre and a playground.
Baruipur College was established at Baruipur in 1981.
Al Ameen Memorial Minority College was established  at Baruipur in 2008.
Dhruba Chand Halder College was established at Dakshin Barasat in 1965.
Kultali Dr. B .R. Ambedkar College was established at Kultali in 2005.
Bhangar Mahavidyalaya was established at Bhangar in 1997.
Sushil Kar College was established at Champahati in 1968.
Sonarpur Mahavidyalaya was established at Sonarpur in 1985.
Future Institute of Engineering and Management was established at Sonarpur in 2001.
Rabindra Shiksha Sammilani Law College was established at Panchghara Petua, PO Subhashgram in 2003.

Healthcare
The table below (all data in numbers) presents an overview of the medical facilities available and patients treated in the hospitals, health centres and sub-centres in 2014 in South 24 Parganas district.  
 

Note: The district data does not include data for portions of South 24 Parganas district functioning under Kolkata Municipal Corporation. The number of doctors exclude private bodies.

Medical facilities in Baruipur subdivision are as follows:

Hospitals: (Name, location, beds)

Baruipur subdivisional hospital, Baruipur, 250 beds
Pranati Bhattacharya Smriti Matrisadan, Sonarpur, 20 beds
Jaynagar Majilpur Maternity Home, Jaynagar Majilpur, 10 beds
Jaynagar Hospital, Jaynagar Majilpur, 2 beds

Rural Hospitals: (Name, CD block, location, beds) 

Sonarpur Rural Hospital, Sonarpur CD block, Sonarpur, 25 beds
Padmerhat Rural Hospital, Jaynagar I CD block, Padmerhat, 30 beds
Sri Ramakrishna Rural Hospital, Jaynagar II CD block, Nimpith, 30 beds
Jaynagar Rural Hospital, Kultali CD block, Jamtala, 25 beds
Nalmuri Rural Hospital, Bhanagar I CD block, Nalmuri, 30 beds
Jirongachhi Rural Hospital, Bhangar II CD Block, Jirongachhi, 30 beds

Block Primary Health Centres: (Name, CD block, location, beds)

Hariharpur Block Primary Health Centre, Baruipur CD block, Hariharpur, PO Mallikpur, 10 beds

Primary Health Centres: (CD block-wise)(CD block, PHC location, beds)
Sonarpur CD block: Kalikapur (10), Fartabad (PO Garia) (6), Langolberia (PO Dakshin Govindapur) (6), Kheadaha (6)
Baruipur CD block: Indrapala (PO Kudrali) (6), Panchgachhia (PO Gocharan) (6)
Jaynagar I CD block: Momrejgarh (Goalberia) (PO Srikrishnanagar) (6), Purba Gabberia (6)
Jaynagar II CD block; Naya pukuria (6), Mayahauri (6), Nalgora (PO Sonatikri) (10)
Kultali CD block: Kantamari (6), Maipit (6), Kaikhali (Gopalganj) (10), Bhubaneswari (6)
Bhangar I CD block: Bhatipota (PO Beconta) (6) 
Bhangar II CD block: Bhnagar (10), Tona (PO Polarhat) (6)

Legislative Assembly Segments
As per order of the Delimitation Commission in respect of the Delimitation of constituencies in West Bengal, the area under Kultali CD Block along with four gram panchayats under the Jaynagar II CD Block: Baishata, Chuprijhara, Monirhat and Nalgora, will form the Kultali (Vidhan Sabha constituency). The other six gram panchayats under the Jaynagar II CD Block, the Jaynagar Majilpur Municipality and six gram panchayats under the Jaynagar I CD Block: Baharu Kshetra, Dakshin Barasat, Harinarayanpur, Rajpur Korabag, Sripur and Uttar Durgapur, will together form the Jaynagar (Vidhan Sabha constituency). The other six gram panchayats under the Jaynagar I CD Block and nine gram panchayats under the Baruipur CD Block: Begumpur, Belegachhi, Brindakhali, Champahati, Hardhah, Nabagram, Ramnagar I, Ramnagar II and South Garia, will together form the Baruipur Purba (Vidhan Sabha constituency). The other ten gram panchayats under the Baruipur CD Block along with the Baruipur Municipality will form the Baruipur Paschim (Vidhan Sabha constituency). Wards 8–24 of the Rajpur Sonarpur Municipality and six gram panchayats under Sonarpur CD Block: Kalikapur I, Kalikapur II, Langalberia, Poleghat, Pratapnagar and Sonarpur II, will together form the Sonarpur Dakshin (Vidhan Sabha constituency). The other six gram panchayats under Sonarpur CD Block, along with wards 1–7 and 25–35 of Rajpur Sonarpur Municipality will form the Sonarpur Uttar (Vidhan Sabha constituency). The Bhangar II CD Block and three gram panchayats under the Bhangar I CD Block: Jagulgachhi, Narayanpur and Pranganj, will together define the extent of the Bhangar (Vidhan Sabha constituency). The other six gram panchayats under the Bhangar I CD Block will be part of the Canning Purba (Vidhan Sabha constituency). The legislative assembly constituencies of Kultali, Jaynagar and Baruipur Purba will be reserved for Scheduled Castes (SC) candidates. The legislative assembly constituencies of Kultali, Canning Purba and Jaynagar will be legislative assembly segments of the Jaynagar (Lok Sabha constituency), which will be reserved for Scheduled Castes (SC) candidates. The legislative assembly constituencies of Baruipur Purba, Baruipur Paschim, Sonarpur Uttar, Sonarpur Dakshin and Bhangar will be legislative assembly segments of the Jadavpur (Lok Sabha constituency).

References

Subdivisions of West Bengal
Subdivisions in South 24 Parganas district
South 24 Parganas district